Greenhill is an area of Hampstead in the London Borough of Camden in Greater London. The name is topographically derived.

The name was applied to a housing estate built here in 1869, to a block of flats built in 1904, and to the local Greenhill Road.

References

Districts of the London Borough of Camden
Areas of London